Viva is a Peruvian brand of soft drink owned by Backus and Johnston and sold in Perú. Viva is a rival product to Inca Kola sharing the same characteristics such as the yellow color. Viva is sold in PET bottles of 500 mL.

See also
 Inca Kola – direct competitive brand
 Isaac Kola – direct competitive brand
 List of soft drinks by country
 Oro – direct competitive brand
 Triple Kola – direct competitive brand

External links
  Backus web site

Peruvian drinks
Backus and Johnston brands